Reginaldo Dalin Nkogo Obama (born 20 March 1999), sportingly known as Dalí or Dalin, is an Equatoguinean footballer who plays as a left midfielder for Liga Nacional de Fútbol club Cano Sport Academy. He was a member of the Equatorial Guinea national team.

International career
Dalí made his international debut for Equatorial Guinea on 18 January 2018. That day, he was a second half substitution in a 0–1 loss to Rwanda at the 2018 African Nations Championship.

Career statistics

International

References

External links

1999 births
Living people
Association football midfielders
Equatoguinean footballers
People from Bata, Equatorial Guinea
Equatorial Guinea international footballers
Cano Sport Academy players
Equatorial Guinea A' international footballers
2018 African Nations Championship players